The Sierra Leone women's national cricket team represents the country of Sierra Leone in international women's cricket.

In 2011 Sierra Leone was invited to the Africa Twenty20 Women's Tournament held in Uganda. The team participated in the inaugural 2015 North West Africa Cricket Council (NWACC) women's tournament held in The Gambia. The team finished undefeated at the tournament ahead of Gambia, Ghana and Mali.

In April 2018, the International Cricket Council (ICC) granted full Women's Twenty20 International (WT20I) status to all its members. Therefore, all Twenty20 matches played between Sierra Leone women and another international side since 1 July 2018 have been full WT20I matches.

Sierra Leone's first WT20I matches were contested as part of the Botswana 7s tournament in August 2018 against Botswana, Lesotho, Malawi, Mozambique, Namibia and Zambia (matches against Zambia did not have WT20I status). Sierra Leone finished second in the table, with four wins and one loss and lost the final against Namibia by a margin of nine wickets.

In December 2020, the ICC announced the qualification pathway for the 2023 ICC Women's T20 World Cup. Sierra Leone were named in the 2021 ICC Women's T20 World Cup Africa Qualifier regional group, alongside ten other teams.

Records and Statistics 

International Match Summary — Sierra Leone Women
 
Last updated 3 April 2022

Twenty20 International 

 Highest team total: 157/3 v Lesotho on 24 August 2018 at Gaborone Oval 1, Gaborone.
 Highest individual score: 84*, Ann Marie Kamara v Lesotho on 24 August 2018 at Gaborone Oval 1, Gaborone.
 Best individual bowling figures: 4/7, Zainab Kamara v Mozambique on 20 August 2018 at Gaborone Oval 1, Gaborone.

T20I record versus other nations

Records complete to WT20I #1052. Last updated 3 April 2022.

See also
 List of Sierra Leone women Twenty20 International cricketers

References

Women's
Women's national cricket teams
Cricket